Anguillicoloides is a genus of nematodes belonging to the family Dracunculidae.

The species of this genus are found in Europe and Northern America.

Species:

Anguillicoloides australiensis 
Anguillicoloides crassus 
Anguillicoloides novaezelandiae 
Anguillicoloides papernai

References

Camallanida
Nematode genera